Banksia bipinnatifida is a species of shrub that is endemic to Western Australia. It is a prostrate shrub with a lignotuber, an underground stem, only a few divided leaves, large cream-coloured to pale yellow flowers and large fruit.

Description
Banksia bipinnatifida is a prostrate shrub with a lignotuber, an underground stem and only a few above-ground leaves. The leaves are bipinnatipartite, meaning that they are deeply lobed, the lobes themselves lobed, giving the impression of a bipinnate leaf. The edges of the leaflets are rolled under and hairy on the lower surface.

Taxonomy
Specimens of this species were first collected by Charles Fraser near the Swan River during the Stirling expedition of 1827. A formal description was published in 1830 by Robert Brown, who named it Dryandra bipinnatifida and published the description in the supplement to his Prodromus Florae Novae Hollandiae et Insulae Van Diemen. The specific epithet is a Latinised form of the word "bipinnatifid", in reference to the bipinnate appearance of the leaves. In 2007 Austin Mast and Kevin Thiele transferred all dryandras to the genus Banksia.

In 1996, Alex George described two subspecies in the journal Nuytsia. Mast and Thiels also transferred these to Banksia and the names are accepted by the Australian Plant Census:

Distribution and habitat
Banksia bipinnatifida occurs south from Eneabba and Mount Lesueur south to Manjimup and Busselton. Subspecies bipinnatifida grows in jarrah (Eucalyptus marginata) forest and woodland from east of Perth to Manjimup and subspecies multifida is found in kwongan in the northern part of the species' distribution.

References

 

bipinnatifida
Plants described in 1830
Endemic flora of Western Australia
Taxa named by Kevin Thiele
Eudicots of Western Australia